This is the list of international schools located in Addis Ababa, Ethiopia.

List
 Good Beginnings Daycare and Preschool
 International Community School of Addis Ababa
 Sandford International School
 One Planet International School
 British International School Ethiopia
 Andinet International School
 Bingham Academy
 Lycée Guebre-Mariam
German Embassy School Addis Ababa
Kelem International School 
Zagol Academy
Bright Future School
Gibson School Systems

References

Schools in Addis Ababa
International schools in Ethiopia